The 1952 Stanford Indians football team represented Stanford University in the 1952 college football season. The team was led by head coach Chuck Taylor in his second year and played their home games at Stanford Stadium in Stanford, California.

After winning the conference and making it to the Rose Bowl in the previous season, the team was ranked #13 in preseason polls. After winning their first four games, the team lost five of the last six games, including a 26–0 Big Game shutout—its worst loss to rival California in more than half a century—to finish well out of the conference championship.

Running back Bob Mathias, who had won his second gold medal in the decathlon earlier in the summer at the 1952 Summer Olympics, was Stanford's only 1953 NFL Draft selection.

Schedule

Players drafted by the NFL

References

Stanford
Stanford Cardinal football seasons
Stanford Indians football